Electronic funk may refer to:

Synthfunk
Electrofunk
Minneapolis sound
Funktronica
Dance punk

Disambiguation pages